Paralaudakia bochariensis is an agamid lizard found in Tajikistan, Uzbekistan, Turkmenistan, and Kyrgyzstan.

References

Paralaudakia
Reptiles of Central Asia
Reptiles described in 1897
Taxa named by Alexander Nikolsky